The Evil Thereof may refer to:

 The Evil Thereof (1913 film)
 The Evil Thereof (1916 film)